Anodyne was an American hardcore band active from 1997 to 2005. Their music was characterized by chaotic song structures coupled with layers of feedback and noise similar to bands like Kiss It Goodbye, Today is the Day and Black Flag. The lyrics were broodingly introspective and emotional. The band went through several lineup changes before arriving at the definitive line up of Mike Hill, Joshua Scott, and Joel Stallings. Drummer Joel Stallings is notable for introducing blast beats to the band’s sound, which were often employed later in the band's existence. Anodyne was affiliated with a number of independent record labels including Escape Artist, Level Plane, and Chainsaw Safety. They completed several US tours and one European Tour.  Members went on to perform in Versoma, Tombs and Defeatist.

Discography

Albums
 Quiet Wars CD (1999, Escape Artist Records)
 The Outer Dark CD/LP (2002, Escape Artist Records)
 Lifetime Of Gray Skies CD/LP (2004, Level Plane Records)
 The First Four Years CD (2004, Blackbox Recordings)

EPs
 Anodyne 7" (1998, Reproductive Records)
 Red Was Her Favorite Color 7" (2001, Happy Couples Never Last)
 Berkowitz 7" (2001, Alone Records)
 Anodyne/Keelhaul 7" (2002, Chainsaw Safety Records)
 Salo 10" (2003, Insolito Recordings)
 Salo CD (2003, Init Records)
 Anodyne/Defcon 4 7" (2003, Ammonia Records)

External links
 http://exclaim.ca/Reviews/Metal/anodyne-lifetime_of_gray_skies
 https://web.archive.org/web/20110710162457/http://www.earache.com/WickedWorld/interview/anodyne/anodyne.html
 http://www.answers.com/topic/lifetime-of-gray-skies
 https://web.archive.org/web/20090107182019/http://sing365.com/music/lyric.nsf/Anodyne-Biography/5BB71FF12A346B6148256F440006700B
 http://www.cmt.com/artists/az/anodyne/bio.jhtml
 http://www.discogs.com/artist/Anodyne+(5)
 https://web.archive.org/web/20111006191823/http://www.initrecords.com/bands.php?id=12

Musical groups established in 1997
Musical groups disestablished in 2005
Level Plane Records artists